Inverted U may refer to:

 Calmfors–Driffill hypothesis, an economic theory describing the relationship between collective bargaining and employment
 Kuznets curve, an economic theory describing the relationship between income per capita and wealth inequity
 Yerkes–Dodson law, a concept in psychology, describing the relationship between arousal and performance
 ∩ (U+2229 in Unicode); also , the mathematical symbol for Intersection (set theory)
 A shape used to describe narrative structure, specifically the shape for a tragedy